Hugh Trenchard, 1st Viscount Trenchard (1873–1956) was a British officer who was instrumental in establishing the Royal Air Force.

Trenchard may also refer to:

People
 Edward Trenchard, American naval officer
Henry Trenchard (MP for Poole), English politician
 Hugh Trenchard, 3rd Viscount Trenchard (born 1951), British soldier and businessman
 John Trenchard (politician), Seventeenth Century English politician
 John Trenchard (writer), English political essayist
 Stephen Decatur Trenchard, American rear admiral 
 Thomas Trenchard, American football coach
 Thomas Trenchard (Dorset MP)
Thomas Trenchard (died 1671)
 Thomas Trenchard, 2nd Viscount Trenchard (1923–1987)

Other uses
 Viscount Trenchard, a title in the Peerage of the United Kingdom
 Colonel Trenchard, a character in the Doctor Who serial The Sea Devils

See also
 Brian Trenchard-Smith (born 1946), English director, producer, writer, and actor